is a Japanese politician of the Liberal Democratic Party, a member of the House of Representatives in the Diet (national legislature). A native of Osaka and graduate of Otemon Gakuin University, he was elected to the House of Representatives for the first time in 2005 after an unsuccessful run in 2003. He is affiliated to the revisionist lobby Nippon Kaigi.

On January 18, 2021, 10 days after the declaration of state emergency due to COVID-19, Ōtsuka was spotted violating lockdown rules by visiting a restaurant and two hostess bars at night. After an attempted cover-up, he was eventually lead to resign from his Diet post, but remained as a lawmaker.

LDP Profile

 Parliamentary Vice-Minister of Land, Infrastructure, Transport and Tourism
 Parliamentary Vice-Minister of Cabinet Office
 Member, Committee on Land, Infrastructure, Transport and Tourism, HR
 Director, Special Committee on Consumer Affairs, HR
 Deputy Chairperson, Diet Affairs Committee, LDP
 Deputy Director, Land, Infrastructure, Transport and Tourism Division, LDP
 Chief Secretary, Japan-Bulgaria Parliamentary Friendship Association

See also 
 Koizumi Children

References 

 
 Profile on LDP website: jimin.jp/english/profile/members/121003.html

External links 
 Official website in Japanese.

1964 births
Living people
People from Toyonaka, Osaka
Koizumi Children
Members of the House of Representatives (Japan)
Liberal Democratic Party (Japan) politicians
Members of Nippon Kaigi